Guglielmo or Guglielmino Ubertini (circa 1219 – Campaldino, 11 June 1289) was an Italian condottiero (military leader) and bishop of Arezzo. He died in the Battle of Campaldino, leading a force of mainly Aretine Ghibellines fighting against a victorious Guelf army from Florence, Lucca, Siena, Pistoia and Prato. Dante Alighieri putatively fought with the victorious army.

Guglielmo, with the support of the Holy Roman Emperor Frederick II, was confirmed bishop in 1256 by pope Alexander IV. Guglielmo with the support of warriors from Spoleto and the Marche, had defeated in 1288 the Sienese at Pieve del Toppo. Controversy exists as to how willing Guglielmo was to battle the Guelph army at Campaldino. Some sources state he was forced onto the battlefield after attempting to negotiate with Florence. Others holds that Guglielmo, while urged to save himself at Campaldino, refused to leave the battlefield alive. His helmet and sword were displayed for many years in the church of San Giovanni in Florence.

References

Further reading

1219 births
1289 deaths
Italian bishops
Italian military leaders